Haixi Mongolian and Tibetan Autonomous Prefecture, locally also known as Qaidam Prefecture (mong. Qaidam; tib. Caindam; chin. Chaidamu), is an autonomous prefecture occupying much of the northern half of (as well as part of the southwest of) Qinghai Province, China. The name of the prefecture literally means "west of (Qinghai) Lake."

Geladandong Mountain, the source of the Yangtze River, is located here.

History 
After 1949, the People's Government of Dulan County was founded and the area was renamed Dulan Autonomous District; in 1954, Dulan was renamed Haixi Mongol, Tibetan and Kazakh Autonomous District and in 1955, Haixi Mongol, Tibetan and Kazakh Autonomous Prefecture. In 1963, it was renamed "" (with the "Tibetan" added to the official county name). In 1985, after the Kazakhs had returned to Xinjiang, it was again renamed to Haixi Mongol and Tibetan Autonomous Prefecture.

Demographics 
As of the 2017 census, Haixi had 515,200 inhabitants.

The following is a composition of ethnic groups in the prefecture, taken in the 2010 Census.

Subdivisions 
Haixi directly governs 3 county-level cities and 3 counties.

 The southwestern exclave of the Haixi Prefecture, separated from the rest of the prefecture by a "panhandle" of the Yushu Tibetan Autonomous Prefecture, is the Tanggula Town of Golmud City.

Gallery

Notable features
 Delingha City
 Qaidam Basin
 Geladandong mountain
 Headwaters of the Yangtze River
 The Baigong Pipes

Notes

Further reading 
 A. Gruschke: The Cultural Monuments of Tibet’s Outer Provinces: Amdo - Volume 1. The Qinghai Part of Amdo, White Lotus Press, Bangkok 2001. 
 Tsering Shakya: The Dragon in the Land of Snows. A History of Modern Tibet Since 1947, London 1999,

External links
Official website of Haixi Government 

 
Autonomous prefectures of the People's Republic of China
Prefecture-level divisions of Qinghai
Amdo
Mongols in China
Tibetan autonomous prefectures